Notley may refer to:

People
Alice Notley (born 1945), American poet
Bernarr Notley (born 1918), former English cricketer
Bruce Notley-Smith (born 1964), Australian politician, Councillor and former Mayor of the City of Randwick
Charles Notley (1879–1968), British fencer
Frederick Notley Bartram (1869–1948), New Zealand Member of Parliament for Grey Lynn in Auckland
Grant Notley (1939–1984), Canadian politician in Alberta
Rachel Notley (born 1964), Canadian politician, 17th Premier of Alberta, daughter of Grant Notley 
Thomas Notley, the 8th Proprietary Governor of Maryland from 1676 through 1679

Places
Black Notley, village and civil parish in Essex, England
Dunvegan-Central Peace-Notley, provincial electoral district in northern Alberta, Canada
Great Notley, suburban development on the fringe of Braintree, Essex
Notley Abbey within Aylesbury Vale district in Buckinghamshire, England
Notley High School, in Braintree in Essex, England
White Notley, parish in Essex, England
White Notley railway station serves the village of White Notley, in Essex, England

See also
Motley (disambiguation)
Mottley (disambiguation)
Nottle (disambiguation)
Nutley (disambiguation)